T-Mobile US, Inc. is an American wireless network operator headquartered in Overland Park, Kansas and Bellevue, Washington, U.S. Its largest shareholder is a multinational telecommunications company Deutsche Telekom AG, which , holds 48.4 percent of the common stock. T-Mobile US is the second-largest wireless carrier in the United States, with more than 110 million subscribers .

The company was founded in 1994 by John W. Stanton of the Western Wireless Corporation as VoiceStream Wireless. Deutsche Telekom then gained plurality ownership in 2001 and renamed it after its T-Mobile brand. T-Mobile US provides wireless voice and data services in the United States under the T-Mobile and Metro by T-Mobile brands (the latter was acquired via the purchase of MetroPCS in a reverse takeover in 2013, resulting in T-Mobile going public on the NASDAQ stock exchange), and also serves as the host network for many mobile virtual network operators. The company has annual revenues of around $80 billion. In 2015, Consumer Reports named T-Mobile the number one American wireless carrier.

On April 1, 2020, T-Mobile and Sprint Corporation completed their merger, with T-Mobile now being the sole owner of Sprint, making Sprint an effective subsidiary of T-Mobile until the Sprint brand was officially erased on August 2, 2020. As part of the merger, T-Mobile US acquired Assurance Wireless, the service subsidized by the Lifeline Assistance program of the federal Universal Service Fund.

History
T-Mobile U.S. traces its roots to the 1994 establishment of VoiceStream Wireless PCS as a subsidiary of Western Wireless Corporation. After its spin off from parent Western Wireless on May 3, 1999, VoiceStream Wireless was purchased by Deutsche Telekom AG in 2001 for $35 billion and renamed T-Mobile USA, Inc., in July 2002. In 2013, T-Mobile and MetroPCS finalised a merger of the two companies which started trading as T-Mobile U.S.

VoiceStream Wireless

VoiceStream Wireless PCS was established in 1994 as a subsidiary of Western Wireless Corporation to provide wireless personal communications services (PCS) in 19 FCC-defined metropolitan service areas in several western and southwestern states using the GSM digital wireless standard. VoiceStream Wireless' digital, urban service areas complemented the analog, rural service areas marketed by Western Wireless under the Cellular One brand.

Western Wireless spun off its VoiceStream Wireless division into a new company called VoiceStream Wireless Corporation in May 1999.

Omnipoint and Aerial acquisitions
In 2000, VoiceStream Wireless acquired two regional GSM carriers. Omnipoint Corporation, a regional network operator in the Northeastern U.S., was acquired on February 25, 2000. Aerial Communications Inc.; a regional network operator in the Columbus, Houston, Kansas City, Minneapolis-St. Paul, Pittsburgh, and Tampa-St. Petersburg-Orlando markets; was acquired on May 4, 2000. The combined company retired the Omnipoint and Aerial brands and completed integrating the three companies by converting to a single customer billing platform, implementing standard business practices and launching the VoiceStream brand and "GET MORE" marketing strategy in all markets.

Deutsche Telekom acquires VoiceStream and Powertel

On June 1, 2001, Deutsche Telekom (DT) completed its acquisition of VoiceStream Wireless, Inc., for $35 billion and Southern U.S. regional GSM network operator Powertel, Inc., for $24 billion. By the end of 2001, VoiceStream Wireless had 19,000 employees serving 7 million subscribers.

On September 2, 2001, VoiceStream Wireless Inc. adopted the name, T-Mobile USA, Inc. and began rolling out the T-Mobile brand, starting with locations in California and Nevada. T-Mobile USA, Inc. was an operating entity of T-Mobile International AG, before becoming a direct subsidiary of Deutsche Telekom AG.

SunCom acquisition
On September 17, 2007, the company announced the acquisition of regional GSM carrier SunCom Wireless Holdings, Inc. for $2.4 billion; the acquisition closed on February 22, 2008. By September 8, 2008, SunCom's operations were integrated with those of the company. The acquisition added SunCom's 1.1 million customers to the company's customer base and expanded the company's network coverage to include southern Virginia, North Carolina, South Carolina, eastern Tennessee, northeastern Georgia, Puerto Rico and the U.S. Virgin Islands. Following the Suncom acquisition, T-Mobile possessed native network presence in all the major metro areas in the United States.

Aborted acquisition by AT&T

On March 20, 2011, AT&T announced its intention to purchase T-Mobile US from Deutsche Telekom. The Antitrust Division of the United States Department of Justice responded by filing a federal lawsuit on August 31, 2011, to block the merger. AT&T then decided to formally abandon the merger bid on December 19, 2011.

Merger with MetroPCS Communications
On October 3, 2012, MetroPCS Communications reached an agreement to merge with T-Mobile USA. MetroPCS shareholders would hold a 26% stake in the company formed after the merger, which retained the T-Mobile brand. While the new company was still the fourth-largest carrier in the United States (at the time), the acquisition gave T-Mobile access to more spectrum and financial resources to maintain competitiveness and expand its LTE network. The merger between T-Mobile USA Inc. and MetroPCS was officially approved by MetroPCS shareholders on April 24, 2013. The deal was structured as a reverse takeover; the combined company went public on the New York Stock Exchange as TMUS and became T-Mobile U.S. Inc. on May 1, 2013. The merger agreement gave Deutsche Telekom the option to sell its 72% stake in the company formed by the merger and valued at around $14.2 billion to a third party before the end of the 18-month lock-up period.

The "Un-carrier", additional wireless spectrum acquisition
In March 2013, T-Mobile introduced a major overhaul of its plan structure, marketed by branding themselves as being "the Un-carrier". A new contract-free pricing structure with simpler plans was introduced in which a phone's cost is paid over a two-year financing plan. The "Un-carrier" strategy has since been expanded to encompass other value-added services, such as a plan add-on allowing phone trade-ins for early upgrades twice per year, carrying over unused data allotments for up to a year, and zero-rating of selected music and video services (the latter locked to "DVD quality") over the mobile network, These moves came as part of an effort under new CEO John Legere to help revitalize the business as it improves its network quality.

Though this system is said to improve network quality, issues surrounding net neutrality infringement have also come to light. The type of zero-rating that is offered by T-Mobile allows it to charge higher rates to third-parties, meaning that ISP can prioritize the company that pays a higher premium. This makes it more difficult for smaller third-parties who are unable to pay the high premium charged by the ISP.

On June 28, 2013, T-Mobile agreed to buy wireless spectrum for the Mississippi Valley region from its competitor U.S. Cellular for around $308 million, allowing it to expand its 4G network across 29 more markets.

On January 6, 2014, T-Mobile signed agreements with Verizon Wireless to purchase some 700 MHz A-Block spectrum licenses for $2.365 billion. Moreover, a transfer of some AWS and PCS spectrum licenses with a value of $950 million has been agreed upon by T-Mobile and Verizon. The acquisition reportedly gave T-Mobile additional coverage for approximately 158 million people in 9 of the top 10 and 21 of the top 30 U.S. markets.

Merger with Sprint Corporation

On April 29, 2018, T-Mobile US and Sprint Corporation announced their intention to merge. Although the U.S. Justice Department initially approved the merger on July 26, 2019, the attorneys generals from several states filed a lawsuit in the U.S. District Court for the Southern District of New York to block it, alleging that the merger would result in higher prices for consumers in the range of $4.5 billion annually. District Judge Victor Marrero then announced his decision in favor of the merger on February 11, 2020, stating that it "is not likely to substantially lessen competition like the suing [states] had claimed it would" and that Sprint "does not have a sustainable long-term competitive strategy" to remain a viable competitor.

The merger finally closed on April 1, 2020, and then the Sprint brand was officially discontinued on August 2, 2020. Leadership, background and stock changes happened immediately, with customer-side changes happening over time. Billing was already showing the T-Mobile brand, and all retail, customer service, and all other company branding switched to the T-Mobile brand. T-Mobile and Sprint accounts were still managed by employees in separate systems and the company still offered Sprint branded SIM cards. New rate plans were also introduced as well for all new and existing customers from both companies, though all were grandfathered into their current plan should they choose not to switch to a new T-Mobile plan for at least three years.

As part of the Sprint merger, T-Mobile US acquired Assurance Wireless, the service subsidized by the Lifeline Assistance program of the federal Universal Service Fund.

Aquisition of Mint mobile and Ultra mobile 
In March 2023, T-Mobile US agreed to aquire Ka’ena Corporation as well as subsidiaries and brands: Mint Mobile, a successful budget direct-to-consumer prepaid wireless brand in the US, and Ultra Mobile, a wireless service that offers offering international calling options to communities across the country, for up to $1.35 billion. It was noted that Ryan Renolds who owns a majority state in Mint Mobile will stay on as Mint's official spokesman. The deal is expected to close later this year, and the final price will be based on Ka’ena’s performance.

Wireless networks
The company owns licenses to operate a cellular communications network in the 1900 MHz (PCS) and 1700 MHz (AWS) bands with coverage in many parts of the continental U.S., Hawaii, Puerto Rico, and the U.S. Virgin Islands, as well as licenses in the 700 MHz band (block A mostly) available in certain parts of the country. In 2017 T-Mobile also acquired a nationwide 600 MHz license. It expects to deploy this spectrum over the next few years as it is vacated by television stations across the country in stages. With respect to technology, depending on the location, in the 1900 MHz band it deploys GSM, UMTS/HSPA+, and/or LTE (Band 2 and 25); in the 1700 MHz band it deploys UMTS/HSPA+ and/or LTE (B4 and B66); LTE-only in the 700 MHz (B12) and 850 MHz (B5) bands; LTE and 5G NR on 600 MHz (B71) and 2500 MHz (B41) bands; and 5G NR only on 24 GHz (n258), 28 GHz (n261) and 39 GHz (n260) bands. Its LTE network also supports VoLTE. It provides coverage in areas where it does not own radio frequency spectrum licenses via roaming agreements with other operators of compatible networks. T-Mobile began its VoNR rollout in June 2022.

Cellular network

2G GSM

The company's predecessor, VoiceStream Wireless, began building a regional, 2G, 1900 MHz GSM, circuit-switched, digital cellular network in 1994 and first offered service in 1996 in Honolulu and Salt Lake City. From that starting point, the network has expanded in size through acquisitions of other cellular-network operators and additional spectrum purchases. The network has also expanded in capabilities through the introduction of new technologies. VoiceStream upgraded the 1900 MHz network to include packet switching via General Packet Radio Service (GPRS), then increased packet-switched data transmission speeds via Enhanced Data Rates for GSM Evolution. In 2006, the company spent $4.2 billion to purchase 120 D, E or F block 1700 MHz AWS licenses and began rolling out 3G UMTS services in those frequency bands. The company upgraded network equipment and back-haul capabilities to enable HSPA (High Speed Packet Access), and later HSPA+ and LTE services.

Packet-switched data service first became available to users in the form of General Packet Radio Service (GPRS). Packet-switched data speeds increased when Enhanced Data Rates for GSM Evolution (EDGE) was incorporated into the network. EDGE coverage was available within at least forty percent of the GSM footprint.

Both voice capacity and packet-switched data speed improved when 3G Universal Mobile Telecommunications System (UMTS) equipment was installed in the network. On January 5, 2010, the company announced that it had upgraded its entire 3G network to HSPA 7.2 Mbit/s, an improvement from its previous peak of 3.6 Mbit/s. It also said that it planned to be the first U.S. carrier to deploy HSPA+ across its network by mid-2010. The company had finished HSPA+ trials in Philadelphia, Pennsylvania, and had begun deploying HSPA+ across its network. T-Mobile plans to shut down its GSM network on April 2, 2024.

3G UMTS
In September 2006, the Federal Communications Commission (FCC) auctioned licenses in the first Advanced Wireless Services band. This band was an area of wireless spectrum, half in the 1700 MHz and half in the 2100 MHz frequencies, that was already in use by government services. The spectrum was planned to become available after the government users migrated to different frequencies.

The auction made numerous licenses available in overlapping market-areas, economic-areas, and regional levels. Each license was individually bid upon, and T-Mobile USA was the winner in 120 license auctions, at an aggregate price of $4.18 billion. As part of its winnings, T-Mobile USA gained nationwide coverage of 1.7 GHz and 2.1 GHz, with numerous areas being supplemented with additional licenses. Examples include New York City, Chicago, and Boston where T-Mobile USA acquired one-third (33 percent) of the available spectrum, or San Francisco, Houston, and Miami where they acquired 45 percent of the available spectrum.

On October 6, 2006, two weeks after confirming its winning bids, the company announced its intentions to create a UMTS third-generation, or 3G, cellular network with the spectrum it had won. It said it would utilize and build on the experience of T-Mobile International's European subsidiaries, which already implemented 3G networks. At the time of initial roll-out, the company intended to offer 7.2 Mbit/s service, making the company's 3G network the fastest in the U.S. The upgrade was forecast to cost $2.6 billion, in addition to the $4.12 billion spent to acquire the spectrum licenses.

In the same announcement, the company indicated it had already begun to deploy about half of the upgraded equipment, beginning in major markets such as New York City. With the equipment in place, it would be able to activate its network as soon as the government agencies vacated the spectrum. The company had hoped to have its network activated by mid-2007, but as of September 2007, the government users had not vacated the AWS band.

The company began selling its first 3G-capable phone, the Nokia 6263, in November 2007 and announced in February 2008 that its 3G network would finally be activated "within the next few months". and released in the New York City market on May 1, 2008.

By 2009, the company had launched its 3G network in more than 200 markets, covering some 208 million points of presence (POPS). On June 28, 2010, the company announced that it would begin to upgrade its network from HSPA+ 21 to HSPA+ 42 beginning sometime in 2011. T-Mobile also markets HSPA and HSPA+ services as 4G. Throughout 2015, T-Mobile began refarming UMTS/HSPA services from the original AWS band to their PCS band to expand bandwidth available for LTE. This rendered a select number of T-Mobile 3G devices inoperable on the 3G network. T-Mobile shut down its UMTS network on July 1, 2022.

4G LTE
On February 23, 2012, during the Q4 Earnings Call, T-Mobile laid out the future of their 4G upgrade path. They would roll out the LTE network on the AWS spectrum, and transition their HSPA+ network to the PCS band. To achieve compatibility with other networks and phones in the US, T-Mobile began this transition in March 2013, and the rollout of LTE is currently underway as T-Mobile expands to more markets. Due to the failed acquisition of T-Mobile USA by AT&T, T-Mobile USA received additional UMTS frequency band 4 (AWS) spectrum. On March 26, 2013, T-Mobile began rolling out LTE in 7 markets: Baltimore, San Jose, Washington, D.C., Phoenix, Las Vegas, Kansas City, and Houston.

On August 21, 2012, the FCC approved a deal between T-Mobile and Verizon in which T-Mobile gained additional AWS spectrum licenses in 125 Cellular Market Areas.

On February 25, 2014, T-Mobile announced in its Q4 2013 earnings call that its 4G LTE network covered 209 million people in 273 metro areas. They also planned to start rolling out their 700 MHz A-Block spectrum by the end of 2014, which by the end of the rollout would cover 158 million people. This spectrum led to improved LTE coverage overall in these areas, particularly indoors.

On March 13, 2014, T-Mobile announced a new plan to upgrade its entire 2G/EDGE network to 4G LTE. They expected 50% to be done by the end of 2014, and it to be "substantially complete" by the middle of 2015.

On December 16, 2014, T-Mobile announced during CEO John Legere's Un-carrier 8.0 interview that their 4G LTE network covered 260 million people and their 700 MHz Band 12 LTE had been rolled out in Cleveland, Colorado Springs, Minneapolis, and Washington, D.C. They expected to cover 280 million with LTE by mid-2015 and 300 million by the end of 2015. They also stated that they covered 121 metro areas with their Wideband LTE.

On October 27, 2015, T-Mobile announced in its Q3 2015 earnings call that they covered over 300 million people with LTE, reaching their 2015 end of year goal months ahead of schedule.  They had 245 markets with Wideband (at least 15+15 MHz) LTE.  They also had 204 markets with Extended Range 700 MHz Band 12 LTE covering around 175 million people.  Their coverage map revealed that they now had new native LTE coverage in Montana, the Dakotas, Eastern West Virginia, and Northern Michigan.

On May 25, 2016, T-Mobile announced that it will be purchasing the 700Mhz A-block license (LTE band 12) for the Chicago metro area. When this transaction closes, together with several other pending 700Mhz license acquisitions, T-Mobile expects to possess 700Mhz licenses covering a total of 272 million people, or 84% of the US population – including 10 of the top 10 largest US metro areas. T-Mobile refers to its 700Mhz low-band network as 'Extended-range LTE' and claims it penetrates buildings and reaches out farther than its PCS and AWS only network. In September 2016, T-Mobile launched 4x4 MIMO and 3 channel carrier aggregation allowing theoretical speeds of 400 Mbit/s, and also announced that the company's LTE network reaches over 312 million potential subscribers.

In early 2017, T-Mobile purchased 45% of available 600 MHz spectrum in the US, covering 100% geographically of the US. They started the rollout of LTE on this band on August 15, 2017.

In 2018 T-Mobile has stated they will not discontinue rollout and upgrades of LTE in favor of 5G. Instead, they will continue to grow and support their LTE network to work simultaneously with 5G.

As of January 22, 2019, the LTE-Advanced upgrade has been deployed in 6,000 cities and towns.

As of October 28, 2019, LTE now covers 326 million people.

As of February 6, 2020, the 600 MHz network reaches 8,900 cities and towns, covering 248 million people.

5G NR

Preparations 
On June 25, 2018, T-Mobile and Nokia completed their first bi-directional 5G NR transmission in the 28 GHz frequency compliant with 3GPP 5G standards, showing a big step forward to building a nationwide 5G Network.

This marks one step closer to a rural 5G network, one highly sought improvement with 5G technology (high-speed data in rural areas).

On January 7, 2019, T-Mobile and Ericsson completed the first audio and video call using a live 5G NR network using 3 separate frequency bands; 600 MHz, 28 GHz, and 39 GHz. This was also the first live network test with successful uplink and downlink.

On July 11, 2019, T-Mobile and Ericsson completed their first n71 (600 MHz) data session in their lab in Bellevue, Washington on a commercial 5G modem, the Snapdragon X55, which is the first commercial 5G modem to feature the n71 band. However, the modem was pre-market and not in any commercially available device.

Vendors 
On July 30, 2018, T-Mobile and Nokia announced a $3.5 billion contract for equipment and software to build out a nationwide 5G network that will be compliant with 3GPP 5G standards. The network will use the 600 MHz and 28 GHz frequency bands.

On September 11, 2018, T-Mobile and Ericsson announced a $3.5 Billion contract for equipment to build out a nationwide 5G network that will be compliant with 3GPP 5G standards. The network will use the 600 MHz and 28 GHz frequency bands. This marks $7 billion already invested in T-Mobile's 5G network, which will use both companies equipment.

Launches 
On February 26, 2018, T-Mobile announced it would roll out 5G to 30 cities by the end of 2018, with compatible handsets delivering early 2019. They also stated their 5G network will be able to work simultaneously with their 4G LTE network, delivering faster speeds and broader range.

On June 28, 2019, T-Mobile officially launched their 5G mmWave network with the launch of their first commercially available 5G NR device, the Galaxy S10 5G. The network has launched in 6 cities; Los Angeles, NYC, Atlanta, Dallas, Las Vegas, and Cleveland.

On August 4, 2020, T-Mobile launched standalone (SA) mode across their national 5G network, becoming the first operator in the world to do so. They also stated SA mode improved 5G coverage because a connection to a mid-band LTE cell was no longer required as it was in non-standalone mode (NSA).

Extended-Range 5G 
On November 7, 2019, T-Mobile announced that its 600 MHz 5G network will launch on December 6, 2019. The network will launch alongside the first two 600 MHz 5G-capable devices, the Samsung Galaxy Note 10+ 5G and the OnePlus 7T Pro 5G McLaren Edition.

On December 2, 2019, T-Mobile officially launched its 600 MHz 5G network. It launched with an initial coverage of 200 million people and over 5,000 cities or towns.

As of February 15, 2023, T-Mobile's 600 MHz network covers an estimated 323 million pops.

Ultra Capacity 5G 
On April 21, 2020, T-Mobile launched the T-Mobile branded 2.5 GHz as Ultra-Capacity 5G with the spectrum it acquired in the Sprint merger in Philadelphia. As of February 15, 2023, Ultra-Capacity 5G (including PCS, 2.5 GHz and 24/28/39 GHz) covers over 260 million pops, by providing an average speed of 400 MB/s and is currently aiming to reach 300 million pops by the year-end of 2023.

T-Mobile also stated that the same network will go live in New York, NY, the first city with all 3 parts of T-Mobile's "layer cake" strategy to 5G NR of having 3 separate bands on low, mid and high band frequencies.

T-Mobile has also acquired C-Band 3.7 GHz licenses in early 2021 for an average of 40 MHz of spectrum covering 225 million people nationwide, bidding over $9.3 billion in licenses. This spectrum is currently pending and is going be in use by the end of 2023, adding an additional layer of "Ultra-Capacity 5G" with deployment starting in early 2023.

On January 31, 2022, T-Mobile announced that they have bid on C-Band 3.45 GHz licenses for approximately $3 billion from Auction 110 auctioned off by Federal Communications Commission for an average of 21 MHz of spectrum to bring up to 184 million people covered across the United States, placing second behind AT&T. T-Mobile intends to deploy this spectrum alongside its C-Band holdings in 2023.

Roaming
T-Mobile has roaming arrangements with a number of national and regional mobile network operators, including AT&T Mobility.

As of 2008, prepaid customers have almost all of the postpaid domestic roaming privileges and restricted international roaming to Canada and Mexico.

In 2009, T-Mobile USA began removing AT&T Mobility roaming coverage in many locations across the country, and updated its on-line coverage maps to reflect the smaller coverage area. AT&T Mobility roaming remains available in select locations, primarily on smaller carriers that were acquired by AT&T Mobility after long-term roaming contracts were in place between T-Mobile and the smaller carriers, including Centennial Wireless and Edge Wireless.

On June 29, 2010, the company launched voice service in the Gulf of Mexico on GSM via roaming agreement through Broadpoint. T-Mobile USA was scheduled to launch data service in Fall 2010. Also in 2010, T-Mobile US became a member of the FreeMove alliance.

On October 9, 2013, T-Mobile announced Simple Global, a service included with eligible Simple Choice plans. This service allows one to roam in over 100 countries with unlimited text and speed-limited data, and make calls at $0.20/minute. High-speed data passes will be available for purchase. On March 7, 2014, T-Mobile announced this number will be increasing to 122 countries. If one is connected to WiFi in one of these countries, and their phone supports WiFi calling, all calls and texts to and from the USA are free, and work the same as if they were on the cellular network.

On July 15, 2015, T-Mobile launched Mobile Without Borders, a service included with all new T-Mobile plans and available as an add-on to grandfathered or promotional plans for $10. This service allows the user to use their normal voice, text message, and data allotments while roaming in Mexico and Canada. Most T-Mobile services are available while roaming, with the notable exception of using the data in one's Data Stash.

In August 2015, T-Mobile joined the Competitive Carriers Association's Data Services Hub, enabling the company to expand roaming partnerships with over a dozen rural and regional carriers. Smaller carriers will now be able to access T-Mobile's LTE network for roaming and T-Mobile will be able to expand roaming partnerships and extend its footprint with members whose network technologies had previously been incompatible.

In October 2017, T-Mobile announced that starting November 12, 2017, LTE-speeds will be limited at 5 GB (with speeds going at speeds at 128 kbit/s or 256 kbit/s on some plans) while data roaming in Canada and Mexico still remains unlimited. However, calling and texting in these countries still remain free from roaming charges. T-Mobile also announced a partnership with US Cellular in California, Iowa, Washington, and Wisconsin to expand 4G LTE coverage. Compatible device required.

In August 2022, T-Mobile and SpaceX announced a partnership called Coverage Above and Beyond where the latter's satellites would provide connections for cellphones throughout the US, even in remote areas with no existing service. The goal was to allow customers to have service everywhere, with no dead zones. Starlink satellites would function like cell towers. At the time of announcement, the plan was to start with text messages and messaging apps and using existing hardware as opposed to new phones.

Radio frequency spectrum chart

T-Mobile network 
The following chart describes radio frequency spectrum bands accessible by the company's customers.

Past networks 

The following chart lists the networks that T-Mobile previously operated.

Sprint network 

Sprint's legacy network is in the process of being decommissioned and integrated into T-Mobile's network.
Sprint's CDMA network was completely shut down on May 31, 2022. Sprint's LTE network was discontinued on June 30, 2022.

T-Mobile HotSpots
T-Mobile has used the term "Hotspot" to represent various products and technologies.

Wi-Fi network (public)

The company operates a nationwide Wi-Fi Internet access network under the T-Mobile HotSpots brand. The T-Mobile HotSpots network consists of thousands of Wi-Fi access points installed in businesses, hotels, and airports throughout the U.S.

The T-Mobile HotSpot service offers access to a nationwide network of approximately 8,350 access points, installed in venues such as Starbucks coffeehouses, FedEx Office Office and Print Centers, Hyatt hotels and resorts, Red Roof Inns, Sofitel hotels, Novotel hotels, the airline clubs of American Airlines, Delta Air Lines and United Airlines, as well as airports.

The T-Mobile HotSpots network can be traced to the company's 2002 purchase of bankrupt wireless ISP MobileStar, which began building its network in 1998. After completing the purchase, the company expanded the network into 400 Borders bookstores, as well as 100 of the most-frequented airport clubs and lounges operated by American Airlines, Delta Air Lines, and United Airlines.

On September 14, 2014, T-Mobile partnered up with GoGo to provide free texting on airplanes for its customers. GoGo services are provided on Delta Air Lines, American Airlines, United Airlines and Alaska Airlines.

On June 6, 2016, T-Mobile expanded its partnership with GoGo to offer T-Mobile users one hour of free WiFi on customers phones while T-Mobile One Plus and One Plus International users also get free WiFi throughout the entire flight. T-Mobile also included other messaging apps (iMessage, Google Hangouts, WhatsApp and Viber) in addition to SMS texting being provided since September 2014.

Wi-Fi network (private)
T-Mobile has also used the term to describe Wi-Fi Access Points that it sold to end users to expand their cell phone network to phones equipped to also receive Wi-Fi using a VOIP-like technology.  (The models included at least two by Linksys: the WRTU54G-TM and the WRT54G-TM and one by D-Link: the TM-G5240.)

Finances 
For the fiscal year 2017, T-Mobile US reported earnings of US$4.481 billion, with an annual revenue of US$40.604 billion, an increase of 8.3% over the previous fiscal cycle. T-Mobile's shares traded at over $62 per share and its market capitalization was valued at over US$58.1 billion in November 2018.

Products and services

Mobile phone & data

Magenta MAX
On January 22, 2021, it was announced that T-Mobile unveiled its newest 5G smartphone plan that offers no throttling called T-Mobile Magenta MAX, the first U.S. wireless carrier to do so. Customers get unlimited Premium Data (4G and 5G), unlimited 4K UHD video streaming, Netflix on Us for single line plans, mobile high-speed hotspot data at 40GB,  Unlimited talk, text, and data in Mexico and Canada with up to 5GB of high-speed data, T-Mobile Tuesdays free thank you gifts and discounts, unlimited Gogo in-flight texting and Wi-Fi all flight long, free texting and data in 210 countries and destinations, and free Scam Shield Premium protection, including free Scam Block and Caller ID. Magenta MAX cost the same as the Magenta Plus plan at $57 per line per month for three lines with autopay with taxes and fees included.

Magenta & Magenta Plus
On June 2, 2019, T-Mobile announced the launch of Magenta and Magenta Plus plans to phase out and replace the T-Mobile ONE family of plans. The Magenta family of plans build on the existing features of the T-Mobile ONE and ONE Plus plans, but now include additional features like 3GB of Mobile HotSpot Data for standard Magenta plans, and retaining the same enhanced HD Streaming, 20GB of Mobile HotSpot Data, and other features of the T-Mobile ONE Plus plans.

T-Mobile has discontinued the Magenta Plus plan but upgrades their Magenta plan by providing 100 GB of premium data and bumping the high-speed hotspot data to 5 GB without overall price change.

Military, First Responder, and Unlimited 55+
Alongside the T-Mobile Magenta family of plans are the specialized plans offered to Military personnel, First Responders, and seniors age 55 and up.

Military and First Responder plans allow for qualified service members to receive 50% off of standard pricing Magenta and Magenta Plus plans. Customers must verify their affiliation within 45 days of activation or switching to the plan in order to retain the discounted offer.

The Unlimited 55+ allows customers at or over the age of 55 to receive a set discounted price on standard rate plans, however these accounts are limited to only 2 lines per account. Certain customers were permitted to add a third line to their account during a specific promotional period.

T-Mobile ONE w/ ONE Plus Family
In August 2018, T-Mobile introduced T-Mobile ONE w/ ONE Plus Family plan, which allows HD streaming and adds 20 GB of mobile hotspot at 4G LTE speeds, and Name ID.

As of June 2, 2019, the T-Mobile ONE and ONE w/ ONE Plus Family plans have been retired and replaced by the new Magenta plans.

T-Mobile ONE
In August 2016, T-Mobile introduced T-Mobile ONE. It will be the only rate plan offered in the future, with plans to gradually phase out Simple Choice. The plan has been criticized by the Electronic Frontier Foundation and others for potentially violating net neutrality rules and making previously included features paid extras.

As of June 2, 2019, the T-Mobile ONE and ONE w/ ONE Plus Family plans have been retired and replaced by the new Magenta plans.

T-Mobile Essentials
The T-Mobile Essentials plan provides customers unlimited talk, text, and data service at a lower price than a standard Magenta or Magenta Plus plan. However, the Essentials plan does not include taxes and fees as the Magenta and Magenta Plus plans do. It also allows T-Mobile to prioritize other customers over Essentials customers' data usage on the network at any time during network congestion or peak times.

Netflix On US
T-Mobile offers many customers Netflix on Us, which covers the cost of a standard Netflix subscription. Customers can upgrade their subscription to Netflix's premium service for an additional cost, which will be added to the customer's T-Mobile bill.

Simple Choice
In March 2013, T-Mobile introduced a new streamlined plan, Simple Choice, for new customers. This is part of an initiative called Un-carrier which drops contracts, subsidized phones, overage fees for data, and early termination fees.

Capping unlimited data users
On August 31, 2015, T-Mobile announced it will ask users who abuse its unlimited on-smartphone data plan by violating T-Mobile's Terms & Conditions regarding tethering (which like unlimited on-smartphone data, remains unlimited, but offers a 14 GB high-speed allotment before throttling takes effect), by permanently removing user access to unlimited plans and migrating users to a tiered data plan. By doing so, all plans after a select amount of inclusive high-speed data, result in automatic throttled speeds, preventing unlimited high-speed tethering use and abuse of the network. T-Mobile stated that there are a small handful of users who abuse the tethering plan by altering device software and/or the use of an Android app that masks T-Mobile's ability monitoring whether data is on-smartphone, or through smartphone mobile hotspot (tethering) by mimicking all data as on-smartphone use, with some customers abusing the service by using as much as 2 TB per month, causing speed issues for all other customers.

InReach program
The InReach program provides a free cell phone and a limited number of voice minutes each month for low-income-eligible families (one per family) who do not use Lifeline services offered by any other phone or wireless company.  It is funded through the Universal Service Fund, but is only operational in a limited number of states and Puerto Rico.

Prepaid mobile phone & data

Metro by T-Mobile

The former MetroPCS was taken over by T-Mobile in 2013, the new company formed T-Mobile US and currently continues to offer prepaid wireless services under the Metro by T-Mobile brand.

Assurance Wireless

The T-Mobile network has carried Assurance Wireless since the 2020 Sprint merger. The service is subsidized by the federal Lifeline Assistance program, a government benefit program supported by the federal Universal Service Fund. Low-income people who qualify for the services are provided a free phone, free monthly data and minutes, and unlimited texting.

Former prepaid services

GoSmart Mobile
GoSmart Mobile was a T-Mobile branded service that launched in beta on December 7, 2012, and became officially available nationwide on February 19, 2013. GoSmart offered no-contract SIM wireless services. GoSmart Mobile was sold to consumers through dealers who worked as independent contractors under their own company name. Such sellers are known as "Authorized Dealers" with either physical or online stores. In September 2016, T-Mobile sold the brand and 326,000 GoSmart Mobile customers to TracFone Wireless. The customers were reclassified as wholesale subscribers.

Television and streaming

TVision

On December 13, 2017, T-Mobile US announced its intent to acquire the IPTV provider Layer3 TV, which operates in Chicago and Washington, as the basis of its own subscription television service initially planned to launch in 2018. On April 10, 2019, T-Mobile officially announced the re-branding and re-launch of Layer3 TV as TVision Home The service mirrors the hardware, packaging, and pricing models of other linear television providers.

On October 27, 2020, T-Mobile US introduced over-the-top streaming services under the TVision branding. It consisted of several packages, including TVision Vibe (a lower-cost bundle focused on entertainment channels), TVision Live (network television, basic cable and sports networks, as well as cloud DVR), and TVision Channels (with standalone subscriptions for pay television services). TVision Home ceased operations on December 30, 2020.

On March 29, 2021, T-Mobile announced that TVision would be discontinued on April 29, 2021. The provider will instead offer promotional bundles with the third-party providers Philo and YouTube TV.

Financial services

Banking cards
On January 22, 2014, T-Mobile announced that it would expand its products into banking. T-Mobile would provide Visa card with banking features and a smartphone money management application with reduced-fee or zero-cost services for T-Mobile wireless customers. In addition, customers would have access to over 42,000 ATMs with no fees. In early 2016, T-Mobile decided to discontinue the banking cards. They can no longer be purchased at T-Mobile.

Online banking
In early 2019, T-Mobile released an online banking option called "T-Mobile Money".

Customer service

Team of Experts

In 2018, T-Mobile officially announced its new customer care concept called Team of Experts. The premise being customers never being transferred to another department. All representatives are trained in billing, payment arrangements, and cancellations when in the past each had their own separate department. In addition to being cross-trained, the Team of Experts, which consists of usually between 30 and 35 account reps, 4 to 6 technical support representatives, 4 supervisors overseeing the representatives, and one manager, are assigned specific markets, usually within the region the call center is in.

Awards
From as early as 2004, the company has captured multiple J. D. Power annual awards in the areas of retail sales satisfaction, wireless customer care, and overall customer satisfaction. In 2011, J. D. Power and Associates stated that T-Mobile retail stores achieved the highest ratings among major wireless carriers for customer satisfaction for the fourth consecutive year, performing particularly well in price and promotions. Also in 2011, J. D. Power and Associates ranked T-Mobile USA highest among major providers in wireless customer care for the second consecutive year.

On December 3, 2015, Consumer Reports named T-Mobile the number one American wireless service provider. The results combine data from customer service, voice quality, text messaging services, and data speeds.

On February 6, 2016, T-Mobile was awarded the JD Power Award for customer satisfaction in the full-service wireless category for the second year in a row. T-Mobile received the highest score ever in the wireless industry.

In 2019, T-Mobile was recognized as one of Fortune's Top 100 Companies To Work For, ranking #49.

Marketing

Jamie Lee Curtis was the spokesperson for T-Mobile USA's predecessor, VoiceStream Wireless, since 1998. VoiceStream's advertising slogan was: "Get more from life". During the transition to the T-Mobile brand, Jamie Lee Curtis continued as a spokesperson for a short time and the slogan was changed to "T-Mobile. Get More."
Starting in 2002, the company's spokesperson was Catherine Zeta-Jones who was the main figure in its branding strategy. As of September 2006, Zeta-Jones had officially been dropped as the "face" of the company for its advertising campaigns due to a corporate rebranding strategy. The company also relied on rapper Snoop Dogg as the spokesperson for its T-Mobile Sidekick in a series of commercials late in 2004, the company also released a series of Sidekick phones known as the D-Wade Edition for basketball player Dwyane Wade.

The company is also an official sponsor of Major League Baseball, the National Basketball Association, the NBA Rookie Challenge, Women's National Basketball Association, and the Overwatch League. In Puerto Rico, the company also sponsors the Puerto Rico Olympic Committee.

In late May 2009, Zeta-Jones was brought back as a company spokesperson to show customers how to pay less for their wireless plan in a new "Mobile Makeovers" advertising campaign that refers a customer to third-party comparison site BillShrink.com.

In late 2009, commercials for the T-Mobile MyTouch 3G featured the song "If You Want to Sing Out, Sing Out" by Cat Stevens and celebrities such as Chevy Chase, Molly Shannon, Dana Carvey, and Darrell Hammond. Another commercial with the same song performed by a different artist showed Wyclef Jean, Avril Lavigne, and Brad Paisley.

Carly Foulkes is the spokeswoman for the myTouch 4G in commercials that parody the Get a Mac campaign. The model is known for Rugby Ralph Lauren ads.
Although Foulkes is often identified with the color pink, T-Mobile actually has a color trademark for the color magenta, and markets itself using its corporate colors.
Virgin Mobile has, in turn, parodied the Carly Foulkes ads.

In September 2010, the company launched "Kids are free till 2012" for family lines.

On December 1, 2011, a group of 100 Chicago-area women, along with Carly Foulkes, were featured in a flash-mob style performance at Woodfield Mall in Schaumburg, Illinois, where the group, dressed in magenta dresses, sang and danced through the mall's atrium to their cover of (There's No Place Like) Home for the Holidays. The performance was filmed and edited into a holiday commercial, which was a success.

T-Mobile US has naming rights contracts with several prominent US sports venues. In 2016, the company signed a contract to place its name on a venue then nearing completion on the Las Vegas Strip. T-Mobile Arena became home to the Vegas Golden Knights of the NHL the following year. In 2018, with Safeco Insurance choosing not to renew its naming contract with Major League Baseball's Seattle Mariners to place its name on the team's stadium, T- Mobile US signed a similar deal, resulting in the former Safeco Field becoming T-Mobile Park on January 1, 2019. Most recently, the name of the main indoor arena in Kansas City, Missouri changed from Sprint Center to T-Mobile Center following the two companies' 2020 merger. Additionally, T-Mobile US has naming rights for the Distrito T-Mobile, an entertainment and retail complex located next to the Puerto Rico Convention Center in San Juan, Puerto Rico.

Un-carrier movement
Starting in 2013, T-Mobile launched the Un-carrier marketing campaign. This movement introduced a slew of new tactics to offer consumers cheaper rate plans, cheaper global coverage, and several other benefits. T-Mobile CEO John Legere laid out an "Un-Carrier manifesto" highlighting the approach and goals he wanted the company to pursue. One popular Un-carrier move features T-Mobile Tuesdays, where customers are offered a variety of free products and also able to win prizes. The most recent Un-carrier campaign is titled "T-Mobile One". This is a new family plan offering, replacing all previous plans and is an all-inclusive unlimited plan, giving unlimited talk, text, and data. The only caveat being a video streaming on any device is limited to 480p resolution. CEO John Legere in an interview said "The biggest pain point that a million customers told me about is that they hate data buckets. And we had such success with Binge On that we wanted to turn our company into somebody that's selling a monthly subscription to the internet, all in, unlimited." As of October 7, 2016, about a quarter of the overall account numbers have moved over to T-Mobile One, and about three-quarters of new postpaid accounts are activating on T-Mobile One.

Labor relations
T-Mobile US employees and two labor unions have led multiple unionization attempts beginning as early as 2001.

Formation of TU
Hundreds of T-Mobile employees, with the backing of the Communications Workers of America (CWA) and the German union ver.di, have come together as TU to gain representation at T-Mobile. In July 2011, technicians in Connecticut, voted for representation by the Communications Workers of America-TU. On September 25, 2013, MetroPCS workers in Harlem, NY, voted for a union voice and representation by CWA-TU.

2009 coordinated organizing effort

In 2008, the CWA and ver.di launched a coordinated effort to unionize company employees. A spokesman for the CWA called on the company to stop resisting mobilization efforts and allow company employees to unionize as German employees of T-Mobile USA's parent company, DT, have done. In response, the company released an employee satisfaction study showing that more than seventy percent of the company's 40,000 workers were "very satisfied" with their jobs. Through a spokesman, the company stated, "Despite the Communication Workers of America's periodic organizing efforts for more than nine years, no group of T-Mobile employees has ever chosen to be represented by a union. While our company is always striving to find ways to improve, year after year, employees continue to view T-Mobile as a good place to work where they have no need for, or interest in, a union."

Political pressure
In 2009, a number of politicians, in one case acting after lobbying efforts by CWA union activists, wrote letters to René Obermann, DT's chief executive officer, in an effort to influence T-Mobile USA's labor practices in the U.S.

In a March 13, 2009, letter, U.S. Senator John Kerry (D-MA) asked "why the company's approach to labor rights are different in Germany than in the United States". In an April 30, 2010, letter sent after lobbying by Communications Workers of America activists, 26 Democratic members of Congress called on DT to protect and respect workers' rights in the U.S. A separate July 1, 2010, letter from seven Republicans addressed the same issue. On August 10, 2010, U.S. Senator Bob Casey (D-PA) released a statement in support of the worker's efforts to organize a union at the company. In a letter, dated September 21, 2010, fifteen Californian Members of Congress urged Obermann to take action and implement fair and equitable labor relations.

In a November 5, 2009, letter, Thomas DiNapoli, New York State Comptroller and Trustee of the New York State Common Retirement Fund, stated concerns about "the potential impact on the value of T-Mobile that may result from a disenfranchised workforce and the associated negative publicity that may impact T-Mobile's profitability."

Reports

On December 9, 2009, the non-profit organization American Rights at Work published a report written by Prof. John Logan, Director of Labor Studies at San Francisco State University, titled "Lowering the Bar or Setting the Standard? Deutsche Telekom's U.S. Labor Practices". The report details behavior by the company that the author perceives as anti-union including dissemination of anti-union materials, intimidation and threats directed at pro-union workers, "captive audience meetings" and the retention of anti-union specialists. In the report, which is based on documents from the National Labor Relations Board, internal company memos and handbooks, and interviews with workers, Logan asserts that the company engaged in a systematic campaign to prevent employees from forming a union and that DT was guilty of operating by a double standard. He claims that Deutsche Telekom respects workers' rights in Germany, where it cooperates closely with unions, but mistreats workers in the United States and interferes with their right to organize.

On September 2, 2010, Human Rights Watch released a report written by Lance Compa titled "A Strange Case: Violations of Workers' Freedom of Association in the United States by European Multinational Corporations". The report concludes that "company policy has translated into practices that leave the workforce fearful about even seeking union representation." DT proclaims its adherence to international labor law and standards that are embodied in German domestic laws. But HRW found that "T-Mobile USA's harsh opposition to workers' freedom of association in the United States betrays Deutsche Telekom's purported commitment to social responsibility, impedes constructive dialogue with employee representatives, and in several cases, has violated ILO and OECD labor and human rights standards".

Labor Related Awards
T-Mobile has received multiple workplace awards. T-Mobile received a score of 100 on the Disability Equality Index (DEI), which measures disability inclusion. They were also named the Best Place to Work for LGBT Equality by the Human Rights Campaign for four consecutive years. T-Mobile was also awarded a Designation for the top 100 Military Friendly Employer by Military Friendly in 2017 for the tenth time. It was recognized as one of the World's Most Ethical Companies by the Ethisphere Institute for the ninth year in a row. In addition to national awards, T-Mobile has also won local awards in many locations, including the best place to work in Albuquerque, New Mexico and Wichita, Kansas where the company has call centers located. On February 16, 2018 Fortune announced their 100 best companies to work for, naming T-Mobile 86th. On July 24, 2018, Forbes ranked T-Mobile 182nd on their top 300 Best Places to Work for Women list.

Controversies

Sidekick data outage

On October 1, 2009, some users of Microsoft's Sidekick handset temporarily lost personal data, including contacts, notes, and calendars. On October 8, most data services were restored to users.  The company and Microsoft announced on October 10 that Sidekick device data "almost certainly has been lost as a result of a server failure at Microsoft/Danger." On October 15, Microsoft said it had been able to recover most or all data and would begin to restore it.

Network outages
On November 9, 2009, some of the company's subscribers temporarily lost the ability to send and receive calls and text messages for several hours. The company confirmed the outage via Twitter. The company stated that approximately five percent of its subscribers had been affected. It claimed that the problem was caused by a system software error.

On May 8, 2018, subscribers in Houston, Texas experienced a four-hour service interruption caused by damage to a fiber-optic cable.

On June 15, 2020, subscribers across the United States suffered a service outage (primarily voice and text) due to routing issues.

On February 13, 2023, T-Mobile users across the United States experienced widespread network outages. The company quickly responded that they were looking to address the disruption that caused the cellular service outage.

Misrepresentation as 4G
In 2010, T-Mobile began marketing both its HSPA and HSPA+ services as "4G". Media outlets called this branding deceptive.

After the ITU expanded its definition of 4G to include HSPA+, T-Mobile continued to market standard HSPA devices and service as 4G. Not only do these HSPA (non-Evolved) devices continue to not meet 4G standards, they are incapable of operating at 4G speeds. Concerns were also displayed over the possibility of confusion when actual LTE networks were deployed.

Information security
Nicolas Jacobsen was charged with intruding into the company's internal network in January 2005. Reports indicated that for about a year Jacobsen had access to customer passwords, e-mail, address books, Social Security numbers, birth dates, and Sidekick photos. Affected customers included members of the United States Secret Service. Secret Service informant identified Jacobsen as part of "Operation Firewall" which provided evidence that Jacobsen had attempted to sell customer information to others for identity theft. T-Mobile USA and the Secret Service did not elaborate on the methods Jacobsen used to gain access but sources close to the case indicated that Jacobsen exploited an unpatched flaw in the Oracle WebLogic Server application software used by the company. Additional SQL injection vulnerabilities with the company's web site were reported by Jack Koziol of the InfoSec Institute.

T-Mobile offers access to voicemail without the input of a password by default. Parties acting in bad faith may be able to access such voice mailboxes via Caller ID spoofing. To avoid this possibility, T-Mobile recommends that all customers password-protect their mailboxes, but still offers the no password configuration by default due to customer demand.

On June 6, 2009, a message posted from an email account "pwnmobile_at_Safe-mail.net" to the Full Disclosure mailing list claimed that the company's network had been breached and showed sample data. The sender offered "databases, confidential documents, scripts and programs from their servers, financial documents up to 2009" to the highest bidder. On June 9, the company issued a statement confirming the breach but stating that customer data was safe. It claimed to have identified the source document for the sample data and believe it was not obtained by hacking. A later statement claimed that there was not any evidence of a breach.

Privacy and surveillance
T-Mobile USA received a portion of the 1.3 million largely warrantless law enforcement requests for subscriber information (including text messages and phone location data) made in 2011, but refused to state how many requests it received. It did say that in the last decade, the number of requests have increased by 12 to 16 percent annually.

Data retention policies
According to T-Mobile's privacy policy highlights, "Retention and Disposal", information is retained for as long as there is business or tax need or as applicable laws, regulations, or government orders require. T-Mobile notes that it disposes of Personal Information,  uses reasonable procedures designed to erase or render it unreadable (for example, shredding documents and wiping electronic media).

In 2010, the Department of Justice (DOJ) released a document entitled, "Retention Periods of Major Cellular Providers," to advise law enforcement agents seeking to obtain cell phone records. This document was uncovered by the ACLU's coordinated records request on cell phone location tracking by police. Notably, the document showed that T-Mobile subscriber information was retained for 5 years and call detail records were kept for 2 years (prepaid) and 5 years (postpaid).

In 2013, Massachusetts Sen. Edward Markey revealed responses from the top four U.S. wireless providers as well as U.S. Cellular, C Spire, and Cricket/Leap Wireless, to his inquiry regarding user information disclosed to law enforcement officials. The following was T-Mobile's response regarding data retention: T-Mobile US retains customers' historic cell site information and cell tower dump information (180 days); call details records (7–10 years); text message content, data requests, and geo-location data not stored; voicemail content (up to 21 days); subscriber information (6 years after the account is closed).

Comparing the 2010 DOJ memo released by the ACLU and Markey's 2013 wireless data retention disclosures, T-Mobile increased the retention period for subscriber information from 5 to 6 years. T-Mobile also increased its call detail record retention from 2 years (prepaid) and 5 years (postpaid) to 7–10 years.

2021 data breach
On August 16, 2021, T-Mobile confirmed that the company had been hit by a data breach but declined to say whether any customers personal information was accessed or how widespread the damage might be. The company's acknowledged the breach after hackers told Vice that they were selling "full customer info" that was obtained from T-Mobile servers.

On August 18, 2021, T-Mobile gave an update on the latest findings regarding the recent data breach though the investigation is ongoing. According to the preliminary analysis, the attack was able to obtain the records more than 40 million former and prospective customers that have applied for credit as well as 7.8 million existing postpaid customers. T-Mobile has confirmed that the data collected by the hackers included sensitive personal information, such as the first and last names, birthdates, driver's license/ID numbers, and Social Security numbers, but where unable to phone numbers, account numbers, PINs or passwords. T-Mobile is offering two years of free identity protection services from McAfee and is also  recommending its customers to change their PIN as soon as possible. No Metro by T-Mobile, former Sprint prepaid,  or Boost Mobile customers have been included in the attack.

It was reported on August 23, 2021, that T-Mobile has been hit with a pair of class-action lawsuits have been filed in Washington federal court as the  number of both current and former customers impacted by the cyberattack grows. One of the lawsuits accuses T-Mobile of putting plaintiffs as well as members of the class-action to "considerable risk" due to the failure to adequately protect its customers as a result of negligence. The second lawsuit alleges that attack victims have spent as much as 1,000 hours to address the privacy concerns stemming from the attack which includes reviewing financial and credit statements for evidence of unauthorized activity.

On August 24, 2021, it was announced that T-Mobile Business customers have been affected by the recent data breach according to T-Mobile for Business information site which states that the exact business and personal information that was accessed varies by business and individual. The company has determined that the types data that impacts businesses includes Business name, federal tax ID, business address, contact name, and business phone number, as well as the personal information stated in the above paragraphs and that there is no indication that business or personal financial information, including credit or debit card information, account passwords or PINs were accessed by the data breach.

On August 26, 2021, hacker John Binns did an interview on how he was able to get through to T-Mobile's servers.  He  said that he used a readily available tool to locate an exposed router and that it took him a week to penetrate the customer data stored in a T-Mobile data center near East Wenatchee, Washington. He also provided evidence to support his claim of being responsible for the attack and that he stole the data to create “noise” and get attention. The Wall Street Journal asked T-mobile about the claims but they declined comment.

On September 6, 2021, T-Mobile US customers filed class action lawsuits accusing the company of negligence after hackers exposed personal data of million of current, former, and prospective customers. Three lawsuits have been filed in district court and all demand jury trials. Two of the complaints accuse T-Mobile of violating the US Federal Trade Commission (FTC) Act of 1914, which prohibits companies from engaging in “unfair or deceptive” activities, which includes companies failing to maintain appropriate security measures to safeguard customer information. In another filing, plaintiff noted that the FTC provided cybersecurity guidelines advising companies not to maintain personally identifiable information “longer than is needed for authorisation of a transaction”. Another class action suit accuses T-Mobile of violating the California Consumer Privacy Act, which assigns specific penalties to companies which allow unauthorised access to their customers’ data.

See also

 List of companies based in Bellevue, Washington
 List of United States wireless communications service providers
 List of mobile network operators of the Americas

References

External links 
 
 Deutsche Telekom AG website
 T-Mobile's 2021 data breach website

 
Mobile phone companies of the United States
Telecommunications companies of the United States
Wi-Fi providers
Companies based in Bellevue, Washington
Deutsche Telekom
Softbank portfolio companies
American subsidiaries of foreign companies
Telecommunications companies established in 1994
Retail companies established in 1994
American companies established in 1994
1994 establishments in Washington (state)
2013 initial public offerings